Barry Primus (born February 16, 1938) is an American television and film actor, director, and writer.

Career 

While Primus is primarily an actor, he has also worked as a writer and director in films in which  he has acted. For the first decade of his career, he was employed as a stage actor. He gained some experience on TV in shows like The Defenders, East Side/West Side and The Virginian. 

He then made his initial film appearance in the Manhattan-filmed The Brotherhood (1968). His other films include Been Down So Long It Looks Like Up to Me (film) (1971) Boxcar Bertha (1972), Autopsy (1975), Heartland (1979), The Rose (1979), Night Games (1980), Absence of Malice (1981), and Guilty by Suspicion (1991). He had a recurring role on the TV series Cagney and Lacey (1982 — 1988) as Christine Cagney (Sharon Gless)'s boyfriend, Sergeant Dory McKenna, whose drug problem compromises his performance as a fellow police officer.

After working as second unit director on Mark Rydell's The Rose (1979), Primus increased his behind-the-camera activities; in 1992, he directed his first theatrical feature, the "inside" Hollywood comedy/drama Mistress.

A member of the Actors Studio, Primus has taught acting and directing classes at the American Film Institute, Lee Strasberg Theatre and Film Institute, the UCLA campus, and at The Maine Media Workshops in Maine. He has taught acting at Loyola Marymount University and at Columbia University.

Primus's recent film work includes Jackson, a film directed by J.F. Lawton; he had a cameo in Righteous Kill with Al Pacino and Robert De Niro, American Hustle, Grudge Match, and  The Irishman.

Personal life
Primus has been married to choreographer Julie Arenal for over 50 years.

Select filmography

References

External links
 
 
 

1938 births
Living people
American film directors
American male television actors
Male actors from New York City